KFST-FM is an FM radio station broadcasting on 94.3 FM. KFST-FM plays the latest country hits and TSN Radio (Texas State Network) news at the top of the hour with local and area news at 7:15am, noon and 5:00pm Monday-Friday. They also broadcast local sports from the Fort Stockton High School Panthers and Prowlers and the Texas A&M Aggies football. KFST-FM is owned by Fort Stockton Radio Co and is licensed to Fort Stockton, Texas, United States. KFST-FM serves the Fort Stockton-Alpine area. KFST-FM's sister station is KFST (AM) 860.

External links

FST-FM
Fort Stockton, Texas